The Prime Minister of the Democratic Republic of the Congo Sama Lukonde assumed the office on 15 February 2021. He announced his cabinet on 12 April 2021.

Membership 
The members of the cabinet are:

 Prime Minister: Jean-Michel Sama Lukonde Kyenge

Deputy Prime Ministers:
 Minister of the Interior, Security, Decentralization and Traditional Affairs: Daniel Aselo Okito.
 Minister of the Environment and Sustainable Development: Ève Bazaiba Masudi.
 Minister of Foreign Affairs: Christophe Lutundula Apala
 Minister of the Civil Service, Administrative Modernization and Innovation in Public Services: Jean-Pierre Lihau

Ministers of State:
 Minister of Justice, Keeper of the Seals: Rose Mutombo Kiese.
 Minister of Infrastructure and Public Works: Alexis Gizaro Muvuni
 Minister of Portfolio: Adèle Kahinda Mayina
 Minister of Planning: Christian Mwando Nsimba Kabulo
 Minister of the Budget: Aimé Boji Sangara Bamanyirue 
 Minister of Town Planning and Housing: Pius Muabilu Mbayu Mukala
 Minister of Rural Development: François Rubota Masumbuko
 Minister of Entrepreneurship and Small and Medium-sized Enterprises: Eustache Muhanzi Mubembe
 Minister of Land Management: Guy Loando Mboyo.

'''Other Ministers:
 Minister of National Defence and War Veterans: Gilbert Kabanda Rukemba
 Minister of Primary, Secondary and Technical Education: Tony Mwaba Kazabi
 Minister of Public Health, Hygiene and Disease Prevention: Jean-Jacques Bungani Mbanda
 Minister of Finance: Nicolas Serge Kazadi Kadima Nzuji.
 Minister of Transport, Communication Routes and Improving Access to Isolated Regions: Chérubin Okende Senga
 Minister of Agriculture: Désire Nzinga Bilihanzi
 Minister of Fishing and Stockbreeding: Adrien Bokele Djema
 Minister of the National Economy: Jean-Marie Kalumba Yuma
 Ministry of Industry: Julien Paluku Kahongya
 Minister of Regional Integration: Didier Mazenga Mukanzu
 Minister of Higher and University Education: Butondo Muhindo Nzangi
 Minister of Scientific Research and Technological Innovation: José Mpanda Kabangu
 Minister of Hydrocarbons: Didier Budimbu Ntubuanga
 Minister of Postal Services, Telecommunications and New Information and Communication Services: Augustin Kibassa Maliba Lubalala
 Minister of Digital Technology: Désiré Cashmir Kolongele
 Minister of Employment, Labour and Social Security: Ntembe Ndusi
 Minister of Properties and Real Estate Affairs: Sakombi Molendo Aimé
 Minister of Water Resources and Electricity: Mwenze Mukaleng Olivier
 Minister of Human Rights: Puela Albert Fabrice
 Minister of Gender, Family and Children: Gisèle Ndaya Luseba
 Minister of External Trade: Bussa Tongba Jean Lucien
 Minister of Mining: Antoinette N’Samba Kalambayi.
 Minister of Communication and the Media, Government Spokesperson: Muyaya Katembwe Patrick
 Minister of Social Affairs, Humanitarian Actions and  National Solidarity: Modeste Mutinga Mutushayi
 Minister of Professional Training and Crafts: Kipulu Kabenga Antoinette
 Minister of Youth, Initiation of New Citizenship and National Cohesion: Bunkulu Zola Yves
 Minister of Sport and Leisure: Tshembo Nkonde Serge
 Minister of Tourism: Nsimba Matondo Modero
 Minister of Culture, the Arts and Heritage: Catherine Kathungu Furaha
 Minister of Relations with Parliament: Anne-Marie Karume Bakaneme
 Minister to the President of the Republic: Nana Manuanina Kihimba
 Minister-delegate to the  Minister of Social Affairs, in charge of the Disabled and Other Vulnerable Persons: Irène Esambo Diata

There are also 11 deputy ministers.
 Minister of Petroleum and Gas: Aimé Ngoy Mukena.
  Minister of Humanitarian Actions and National Solidarity: Steve Mbikayi Mabuluki.

References

See also 

 Government of the Democratic Republic of the Congo

Government of the Democratic Republic of the Congo
2021 in the Democratic Republic of the Congo
2020s in politics
Cabinets established in 2021
Current governments
2022 in the Democratic Republic of the Congo